Richard Dickson is a Scottish male curler.

Teams

References

External links

Living people
Scottish male curlers
Year of birth missing (living people)
Place of birth missing (living people)